David Fisher may refer to:

Film and theater
 David Fisher (I) (1760–1832), English theatre manager and actor 
 David Fisher (II) (1788–1858), English actor and musician
 David Fisher (filmmaker) (born 1956), Israeli documentary film director 
 David Fisher (writer) (1929–2018), British script writer
 David Nunn Fisher (1816–1887), actor and musician
 David Dayan Fisher (fl. since c. 2000s), British actor
 Walter David Fisher (1845–1889), comic actor and musician
 David Andrew Fisher (fl. 1980s), film director and producer including Toy Soldiers

Politics
 David Fisher (politician) (1794–1886), American politician
 David Fisher (trade unionist) (1852–1912), New Zealand printer, trade unionist and public servant

Other
 David Fisher (artist) (1946–2013), English artist and designer
 David Fisher (footballer) (born 2001), English footballer
 David Fisher (lawn bowls) (born 1956), British lawn bowler
 David Fisher (rugby union) (1871–1932), Scotland international rugby union player
 David C. Fisher (born 1943), American author, professor and pastor
 David Fisher (Six Feet Under), a fictional character in the television series Six Feet Under
 Dudu Fisher (born 1951), Israeli singer

See also
 David Fischer (disambiguation)